Euryclides de Jesus Zerbini (10 May 1912 – 23 October 1993) was a Brazilian physician and cardiac surgeon. He is internationally known for performing the first heart transplantation in Latin America in 1968, and for creating the famous and respected clinical and research center Instituto do Coração da Universidade de São Paulo (Heart Institute of the University of São Paulo), in São Paulo, Brazil.

Further reading
 Ricardo Lima, Fernando A. Lucchese, Domingo M. Braile, Tomas A. Salerno. A tribute to Euryclides de Jesus Zerbini, MD. Ann Thorac Surg 2001;72:1789–1792. 
 de Carvalho VB, Sousa EF, Vila JH, da Silva JP, Caiado MR, Araujo SR, Macruz R, Zerbini EJ. Heart transplantation in Chagas' disease. 10 years after the initial experience. Circulation. 1996 Oct 15;94(8):1815-7. 
 Zerbini EJ. Results of replacement of cardiac valves by homologous dura mater valves. Chest. 1975 Jun;67(6):706-10.  
 Barbero Marcial M, Armelin E, Stolf N, Piantino PC, Macruz R, Verginelli G, Zerbini EJ. Assisted circulation with an auxiliary heart transplant. An experimental study. J Thorac Cardiovasc Surg. 1972 May;63(5):696–704.  
 Zerbini EJ, Decourt LV. Experience on three cases of human heart transplantation. Laval Med. 1970 Feb;41(2):149-54. 
 Losardo RJ et al. Alfonso Roque Albanese: Latin American Pioneer of Heart Surgery. Tribute from the Pan American Association of Anatomy. Int. J. Morphol.. 2017;35(3):1016-1025.

References

External links
 Fundação Zerbini
 Dura mater heart valve invention. (In Portuguese)
 Search for Dr. Zerbini's papers in PubMed

1912 births
1993 deaths
People from Guaratinguetá
Brazilian people of Italian descent
Brazilian cardiac surgeons
University of São Paulo alumni
20th-century surgeons